For Data Art as an emerging art form, see Information artDataArt is an IT consultancy company. The firm designs, develops and supports software solutions. DataArt operates from 20+ locations in the US, Europe (Armenia, Bulgaria, Germany, Georgia, Kazakhstan, Poland, Romania, Switzerland, Ukraine and the UK), Argentina, and the UAE.

History 
DataArt was founded in 1997 in New York City. It started as and remains a U.S. (New York) corporation.

In 1998, DataArt's team, based in St. Petersburg, developed experimental mailbox software. Later it became the basis of Mail.ru.

In 2001, the company opens a London office.

In 2007, DataArt received Microsoft Gold Certified Partner status, this was attained by participating in the Microsoft Customer Satisfaction Index (CSI) program where the company received high customer ratings and earned the status of Small Business Specialist. 

From 2010 to 2018, the company was ranked in the Inc. 5000 List of the fastest-growing private U.S. companies.

In 2011, DataArt became a member of American Chamber of Commerce in Ukraine.

In 2014, DataArt acquired AW Systems and launched development center in Buenos Aires (Argentina).

In 2014, the company declared revenue of $54 million.

In 2018-2019, Da Vinci Capital and German state-owned development finance institution DEG invested in the company. An important reason for the investment was that DataArt employed over a thousand of IT professionals from Ukraine, mitigating brain drain risks. It was strategic investment as the institutions work on promoting sustainable economic development in Ukraine, Argentina, and Armenia.

In May 2019, DataArt achieved ISO 9001 Certification (an international standard for quality management systems) for software design and development.

In December 2019, DataArt partnered with Metro Markets with the purpose to build the largest B2B online marketplace.

In 2021, DataArt opened additional R&D center in Bulgaria (Plovdiv) as well as new offices in Kazakhstan and Georgia.

In 2021, DataArt appeared among the Inc. 5000 America's Fastest-Growing private companies and was included on Best Company Culture list by Comparably.

In 2022, DataArt left the Russian market on 15 June. 

In September 2022, DataArt announced the acquisition of Lola Tech, thus entering the software development market in Romania. Lola Tech’s Cluj-Napoca hub becomes the first development centre in Romania.

DataArt employs over 6000+ people in 20+ locations in the US, Europe, and Latin America.

DataArt's development offices are located in: Ukraine (Kyiv, Lviv, Kharkiv, Dnipro, Odessa, Kherson), Poland (Wroclaw, Lublin), Romania (Cluj-Napoca), Bulgaria (Sofia), Argentina (Buenos Aires). The company is headquartered in New York.

Product 
DataArt specializes in product development, system modernization, security service, managed support, digital transformation.

Clients 
DataArt's clients are big tech companies including Ocado, Travelport, Centrica/Hive, Paddy Power Betfair, IWG, Univision, Meetup and Apple Leisure Group among others. The company is also cooperating with Girls Who Code, the firm is closely collaborating with various Women in IT initiatives in Eastern Europe and sponsoring many events that attract female IT specialists. Women TechMakers, Python Community for Women, Toastmasters International, and Geek Girls Carrots are among DataArt’s partners.

References

External links 
Official website

Companies based in New York City
Outsourcing companies
Software companies of the United States
International information technology consulting firms